Maud of Wales  (Maud Charlotte Mary Victoria; 26 November 1869 – 20 November 1938) was Queen of Norway as the wife of King Haakon VII. The youngest daughter of King Edward VII and Queen Alexandra of the United Kingdom, she was known as Princess Maud of Wales before her marriage, as her father was the Prince of Wales at the time.

Early life and education

Maud was born on 26 November 1869 at Marlborough House, London. She was the third daughter and fifth child of Albert Edward, Prince of Wales, and Alexandra, Princess of Wales. Albert Edward was the eldest son of Queen Victoria, and Alexandra was the eldest daughter of Christian IX of Denmark. Maud was christened "Maud Charlotte Mary Victoria" at Marlborough House by John Jackson, Bishop of London, on 24 December 1869.
Her godparents were her paternal uncle Prince Leopold, for whom the Duke of Cambridge stood proxy; Prince Frederick William of Hesse-Kassel, for whom Prince Francis of Teck stood proxy; Count Gleichen; the Duchess of Nassau, for whom Princess Francis of Teck stood proxy; Charles XV of Sweden, for whom Swedish minister Baron Hochschild stood proxy; Princess Marie of Leiningen, for whom Princess Claudine of Teck stood proxy; her maternal aunt the Tsarevna of Russia for whom Baroness de Brunnow stood proxy; Crown Princess Louise of Denmark, for whom Madame de Bülow, wife of the Danish minister, stood proxy; and her great-great-aunt the Duchess of Inverness.

The tomboyish Maud was known as "Harry" to the royal family, after Edward VII's friend Admiral Henry Keppel, whose conduct in the Crimean War was considered particularly courageous at the time. Maud took part in almost all the annual visits to the Princess of Wales's family gatherings in Denmark and later accompanied her mother and sisters on cruises to Norway and the Mediterranean. She was a bridesmaid at the 1885 wedding of her paternal aunt Beatrice to Prince Henry of Battenberg, and at the wedding of her brother George to Mary of Teck in 1893.

Maud, along with her sisters, Victoria and Louise, received the Imperial Order of the Crown of India from their grandmother Queen Victoria on 6 August 1887. Like her sisters, she also held the Royal Order of Victoria and Albert (First Class) and was a Dame Grand Cross of the Order of the Hospital of St. John of Jerusalem.

Princess of Denmark

Maud married relatively late, waiting until her late twenties to find a husband. She had initially wanted to marry a distant cousin, Prince Francis of Teck, younger brother of her sister-in-law Mary. Despite being relatively impoverished from mounting gambling debts and being in a position to possibly benefit from Maud's status, he ignored her advances.

On 22 July 1896, Princess Maud married her first cousin, Prince Carl of Denmark, in the private chapel at Buckingham Palace. Prince Carl was the second son of Queen Alexandra's eldest brother, Crown Prince Frederick of Denmark, and Princess Louise of Sweden. The bride's father gave them Appleton House on the Sandringham Estate as a country residence for her frequent visits to England. It was there that the couple's only child, Prince Alexander, was born on 2 July 1903.

Prince Carl served as an officer in the Royal Danish Navy, and he and his family lived mainly in Denmark until 1905. In June 1905 the Norwegian Storting dissolved Norway's 91-year-old union with Sweden and voted to offer the throne to Prince Carl of Denmark. Maud's membership in the British royal house played some part in why Carl was chosen. Following a plebiscite in November, Prince Carl accepted the Norwegian throne as King Haakon VII, while his young son was renamed Olav. King Haakon VII and Queen Maud were crowned at Nidaros Cathedral in Trondheim on 22 June 1906; it became the last coronation in Scandinavia to date.

Queen of Norway

Queen Maud never lost her love of Britain, but she quickly adapted to her new country and duties as a queen consort. A court was formed, and Marie Magdalena Rustad was appointed her principal lady-in-waiting. Maud played a strong and dominant role within the court and family, but a discreet role in public.

During her first years in Norway, she and her spouse were photographed in Norwegian folk costumes, and enjoying winter sports such as skiing, to give them a Norwegian appearance in the eyes of the public. She disliked representation but performed her role as a queen with great care, and used clothes and jewellery to make a regal impression. She supported charitable causes, particularly those associated with children and animals, and gave encouragement to musicians and artists. Among her projects was Dronningens Hjelpekomité (the Queen's Relief Committee) during World War I. She supported the feminist Katti Anker Møller's home for unwed mothers (1906), which was regarded as radical, designed furniture for the benefit of the Barnets utstilling (Children's Exhibition) 1921, and sold photographs for charitable purposes. An avid rider, Maud insisted that the stables of the royal palace in Oslo be upgraded. Queen Maud supervised much of this project herself and was greatly inspired by the Royal Mews in London when the stables were expanded.

Maud continued to regard Great Britain as her true home even after her arrival in Norway, and visited Great Britain every year. She mostly stayed at her Appleton House, Sandringham, during her visits. She did, however, also appreciate some aspects of Norway, such as the winter sports, and she supported bringing up her son as a Norwegian. She learned to ski and arranged for English gardens at Kongsseteren, the royal lodge overlooking Oslo, and at the summer residence at Bygdøy. She is described as reserved as a public person but energetic and with a taste for practical jokes as a private person.

Queen Maud's last public appearance in Britain was at the coronation of King George VI and Queen Elizabeth in May 1937 at Westminster Abbey. She sat in the royal pew at Westminster Abbey next to her sister-in-law Queen Mary and her niece Mary, Princess Royal, as part of the official royal party.

Maud also acquired a reputation for dressing with fashionable chic.  An exhibition of numerous items from her elegant wardrobe was held at the Victoria and Albert Museum in 2005 and published in the catalogue Style and Splendour: Queen Maud of Norway's Wardrobe 1896–1938.

Death and legacy

Maud visited England in October 1938. Initially, she stayed at Sandringham, but then moved into a hotel in London's West End. She became ill and was taken to a nursing home at 18 Bentinck Street, Marylebone, London, where an abdominal operation was performed on 16 November 1938. King Haakon immediately travelled from Norway to her bedside. Although she survived the surgery, Maud died unexpectedly of heart failure on 20 November 1938, six days before her 69th birthday and on the 13th anniversary of her mother's death. Norwegian newspapers were allowed to break the law forbidding publication on Sundays in order to notify the Norwegian public of her death. King Haakon returned Appleton House to the British royal family.

Her body was returned to Norway on board , the flagship of the Second Battle Squadron of the Royal Navy's Home Fleet. Her body was moved to a small church in Oslo before the burial. Queen Maud was buried in the royal mausoleum at Akershus Castle in Oslo. At her death, Queen Maud was the last surviving child of King Edward VII and Queen Alexandra. Her will was sealed in London in 1939. Her estate in England and Wales was valued at £7,941 (or £362,400 in 2022 when adjusted for inflation).

Queen Maud Land and Queen Maud Mountains in Antarctica; Queen Maud Secondary School in Hong Kong; and Queen Maud Gulf (including Queen Maud Gulf Migratory Bird Sanctuary) in Nunavut, Canada, are named after Maud. The ship Maud, designed to the specifications of Roald Amundsen for service in the Arctic Ocean and launched in 1916 to traverse and explore the Northeast Passage, was christened in honor of Maud of Wales. The replenishment ship HNoMS Maud of the Royal Norwegian Navy has also been named for her. The Queen Maud fromage (a sweet dessert) is named after her.

Titles, styles, and arms

Titles and styles
 26 November 1869 – 22 July 1896: Her Royal Highness Princess Maud of Wales
 22 July 1896 – 18 November 1905: Her Royal Highness Princess Charles of Denmark
 18 November 1905 – 20 November 1938: Her Majesty The Queen of Norway

Arms
Upon her marriage, Maud was granted the use of a personal coat of arms, being those of the kingdom, with an inescutcheon of the shield of Saxony, differenced with a label argent of five points, the outer pair and centre bearing hearts gules, the inner pair crosses gules. The inescutcheon was dropped by royal warrant in 1917.

Ancestors

Citations and references

Citations

References

External links

 Website of the Royal House of Norway: Queen Maud
  
 

|-

1869 births
1938 deaths
19th-century British people
20th-century British people
19th-century British women
20th-century British women
British princesses
British people of German descent
British people of Danish descent
Burials at the Royal Mausoleum (Norway)
Companions of the Order of the Crown of India
Dames Grand Cross of the Royal Victorian Order
Dames Grand Cross of the Order of St John
House of Saxe-Coburg and Gotha (United Kingdom)
Ladies of the Royal Order of Victoria and Albert
Members of the Royal Red Cross
Norwegian royal consorts
Norwegian people of English descent
Norwegian people of German descent
Norwegian people of Danish descent
People from Westminster
Women of the Victorian era
Children of Edward VII
Daughters of emperors
Daughters of kings